Sosylus extensus is a species of dry bark beetle in the family Bothrideridae. It is found in North America.

References

Further reading

 
 

Bothrideridae
Articles created by Qbugbot
Beetles described in 1897